Carlton Bedminster (born 8 November 1982) is an Antiguan tennis player.

Bedminster hasn't won an ITF title.
 
Bedminster has represented Antigua and Barbuda at Davis Cup. In Davis Cup he has a win-loss record of 10–24.

He won the Eastern Caribbean Tennis Championship in 2006 at the final, he defeated his fellow countryman Carl Johnson 6-3, 6-4. In 2015 he won doubles with Kevin Gardner. In singles he lost the final against the Saint Lucian Vernon Lewis 6-7, 0-6.

In 2007 Bedminster competed at the Pan American Games in Rio de Janeiro, Brazil. At singles he lost in the first round against Yohny Romero. In doubles with Kevin Gardner lost against the number one seeded Chilean Jorge Aguilar, Adrián García duo on the second round.

He competed at the 2018 Central American and Caribbean Games, in doubles with Jody Maginley.

Davis Cup

Participations: (10–24)

References

External links 
 
 

1982 births
Living people
Tennis players at the 2007 Pan American Games
Competitors at the 2018 Central American and Caribbean Games
Antigua and Barbuda male tennis players
Pan American Games competitors for Antigua and Barbuda